Les Minski is an American singer and stage actor.

Minski has been cast as the Marquis St. Evremonde in the Broadway musical adaptation of 'A Tale of Two Cities' opening for preview on August 19, 2008 at the Al Hirschfeld Theatre in New York.

Theatre Credits

A Tale of Two Cities (2008), Marquis St. Evremonde
Carousel, Billy
Annie, Daddy Warbucks
Find Your Way Home, Alan

External links
A Tale of Two Cities
Les Minski on Facebook

References

Living people
Year of birth missing (living people)